Nebularia ancillides is a species of sea snail, a marine gastropod mollusc in the family Mitridae, the miters or miter snails.

Description

Distribution

References

ancillides
Gastropods described in 1836
Taxa named by William Broderip